The 1999 German Figure Skating Championships took place on January 7–10, 1999 in Oberstdorf. Skaters competed in the disciplines of men's singles, ladies' singles, pair skating, ice dancing, and synchronized skating.

Results

Men

Ladies

Pairs

Ice dancing

Synchronized

External links
 1999 German Figure Skating Championships results

German Figure Skating Championships, 1999
German Figure Skating Championships